Kill or Be Killed is the seventh studio album by American band Biohazard. It features new guitarist Carmine Vincent, formerly of Nucleus, who had replaced Leo Curley.

It was noted as return to the traditional style of Biohazard after the more experimental style of the previous album, Uncivilization.

Track listing

The track listing on the album's back cover is incorrect. It incorrectly lists the songs in this order:
Some CD's are only the 10 tracks listed below. Confirmed with ripping software. Sanctuary Records BG2 84563, EMI Canada, distributed by Columbia House. Sleeves could potentially have gone on the wrong CD's that have 11 tracks.

Personnel
Billy Graziadei: lead vocals, guitars
Evan Seinfeld: vocals, bass
Carmine Vincent: guitars
Danny Schuler: drums

Production
Produced by Billy Graziadei and Danny Schuler
Engineer: Pete DeBoer
Mixing: Billy Graziadei, Danny Schuler and Pete DeBoer

References

Biohazard (band) albums
2003 albums
Sanctuary Records albums
Nu metal albums by American artists